The Paroș is a left tributary of the river Strei in Romania. Its source is in the Retezat Mountains. It flows into the Strei in Ohaba de sub Piatră.

References

Rivers of Romania
Rivers of Hunedoara County